Magali de Lattre (born 14 June 1987, in Lausanne) is a retired tennis player from Portugal. She reached her career-high singles ranking of world No. 334 on 20 June 2011, and peaked at No. 523 in the doubles rankings on 28 July 2008.

Career
De Lattre represented the Portugal Fed Cup team, where she has a singles win–loss record of 3–5 and doubles win–loss record of 1–3 (4–8 overall). She retired on 15 September 2011 at the age of 24 due to the lack of sponsor support.

Lattre received a wild card to play in the doubles of the Dubai Tennis Championships in 2011. However, she and Fatma Al-Nabhani were eliminated in the first round.

ITF Circuit finals

Singles: 14 (9–5)

Doubles: 11 (4–7)

References

External links
 
 
 

1987 births
Living people
Sportspeople from Lausanne
People from Sintra
Portuguese people of Swiss descent
Portuguese female tennis players
21st-century Portuguese women